"Conditions on Transformations" is an article on linguistics by Noam Chomsky, published in 1973. In it, Chomsky attempted to formulate constraints on transformational rules used in Transformational Generative Grammar (TGG), a new kind of syntactic theory that Chomsky first proposed in the 1950s. These constraints, or "conditions", helped decrease the number of possible generative grammars, with a goal to account for the process of language acquisition in children.

Chomsky's attempt to greatly constrain the power of transformational rules found a common ground with a new generation of generative linguists in Europe, as evidenced by the quote below:

References

Bibliography
 

Works by Noam Chomsky
1973 essays